Stopford is a surname, and may refer to:

 Charles Stopford
 Alice Stopford Green (1847-1929), Irish historian and nationalist
 Edward Stopford
 Frederick Stopford, British general at Gallipoli
 James Stopford, 1st Earl of Courtown
 James Stopford, 2nd Earl of Courtown
 James Stopford, 3rd Earl of Courtown
 James Stopford, 4th Earl of Courtown
 James Stopford (bishop) of Cloyne (1753-1759)
 John Stopford (rugby league)
 John Stopford, Baron Stopford of Fallowfield
 John M. Stopford, British organisational theorist
 Joseph Stopford, archer
  (1636–1675), Church of England clergyman and author
 Montagu Stopford
 Montagu Stopford (admiral)
 Patrick Stopford, 9th Earl of Courtown
 Philip Stopford
 Robert Stopford
 Robert Stopford (Royal Navy officer)

Stopford may also refer to the Stopford Building of the University of Manchester.